Huckleberry Botanic Regional Preserve is a  regional park and nature reserve in the Oakland Hills, in the eastern East Bay (San Francisco Bay Area) region of the San Francisco Bay Area of California. It is within Alameda and Contra Costa Counties.  It is a park within the East Bay Regional Parks District system. The Preserve is named after the California Huckleberry (Vaccinium ovatum) which grows abundantly within its habitat.

Geography
The Huckleberry Botanic Regional Preserve is on the crest of the Oakland Hills, located above Oakland and Orinda. It represents a relic plant association found only in certain areas along the coastal climate region of California, where specific soil and climatic conditions still exist. It is a very diverse botanical area for native plants of the mixed evergreen forest and montane chaparral and woodlands ecoregions and plant communities. Trails connect the preserve with Robert Sibley Volcanic Preserve on the north, and Redwood Regional Park on the south. 

The Huckleberry Trail is a  self-guided nature path that loops through the Preserve. Besides the California Huckleberry, other plants include the Golden chinquapin (Chrysolepis chrysophylla), western leatherwood, Douglas iris, wood fern and western sword fern. Trees include California Bay (Umbellularia californica), Coast live oak (Quercus agrifolia), pallid manzanita, brittleleaf manzanita, and California hazelnut.

Visitation
The park is open year-round, between 5:00 AM and 10:00 PM daily, unless otherwise posted. No dogs are permitted in the park because of the sensitive plant habitat. There are no reservable campgrounds or picnic sites. Parking is free.

See also
California mixed evergreen forest
List of California native plants
Vaccinium ovatum

References

External links

 Official Huckleberry Botanic Regional Preserve  website

East Bay Regional Park District
Berkeley Hills
Parks in Alameda County, California
Parks in Contra Costa County, California
Natural history of the San Francisco Bay Area
Botanical gardens in California
Parks in the San Francisco Bay Area